The minister of families, children and social development() is a minister of the Crown in the Cabinet of Canada. The associated department is Employment and Social Development Canada.

The position is currently held by Karina Gould, who has served since October 26, 2021.

History
The position of Minister of Social Development was created in 2000 to be responsible for overseeing Social Development Canada a new federal  department concerned with the needs of seniors, children, families and people with disabilities. Prior to 2003, the responsibilities in this portfolio were in the hands of the Minister of Human Resources Development. 

On February 4, 2006, Prime Minister Stephen Harper merged the personnel and responsibilities of Social Development Canada into Human Resources and Skills Development Canada using an Order in Council, and did not name anybody to the post of Minister of Social Development. The post and the department remain legally in existence, however, until Parliament amends the relevant legislation. The recombined department has been styled the Department of Human Resources and Social Development, and the minister was Diane Finley until January 9, 2007.

On November 4, 2015, Prime Minister Justin Trudeau transferred the employment responsibilities to the Minister of Labour and changed the name of the portfolio to Minister of Families, Children and Social Development.

Role
The Minister is also responsible for the:
Canada Mortgage and Housing Corporation
Canada Pension Plan: Pension Appeals Board
Canada Pension Plan: Review Tribunals

List of ministers
Key:

Minister of State for Social Development

On July 15, 2012, MP Candice Bergen was appointed Minister of State for Social Development, a newly created position that was abolished two years later.

References

Families, Children and Social Development
Labour relations in Canada